Impact Wrestling is an American professional wrestling promotion based in Nashville, Tennessee. Former employees in Impact Wrestling consist of professional wrestlers, managers, play-by-play and color commentators, announcers, interviewers, referees, trainers, script writers, executives, and board of directors. In the case of wrestlers originating from Spanish-speaking countries, who most often have two surnames, the paternal (first) surname is used.

Impact Wrestling talent contracts range from developmental contracts to multi-year deals. They primarily appeared on Impact television programming, pay-per-views, monthly specials, and live events, and talent with developmental contracts appeared at Border City Wrestling and Ohio Valley Wrestling. When talent is released of their contract, it could be for a budget cut, the individual asking for their release, for personal reasons, time off from an injury, or retirement.

Those who made appearances without a contract and those who were previously released but are currently employed by Impact Wrestling are not included.

Lists of former personnel 
These lists of personnel are sorted by the first letter of the wrestlers' family name:
List of former Impact Wrestling personnel (A–C)
List of former Impact Wrestling personnel (D–H)
List of former Impact Wrestling personnel (I–M)
List of former Impact Wrestling personnel (N–R)
List of former Impact Wrestling personnel (S–Z)

See also 
List of Impact Wrestling personnel

Impact Wrestling alumni
Impact Wrestling